Ibrohim Yulchiyevich Abdurakhmonov (born 19 February 1975, Chust District, Namangan Region, Uzbek SSR, USSR) is an Uzbek statesman and scientist. In 2012, he founded the Center for Genomics and Bioinformatics of Uzbekistan. Winner of the 2010 TWAS and ICAC awards for outstanding contributions to cotton genomics and biotechnology. In 2017-2022, he served as Minister of Innovative Development of the Republic of Uzbekistan. 

In 2022, he was awarded with the title of Silk Road Friendship Ambassador of the China International Cultural Exchange Center (CICEC) and Global People magazine. In 2023, he was appointed as the Minister of Higher Education, Science and Innovation of the Republic of Uzbekistan. Member of the Academy of Sciences of Uzbekistan and the World Academy of Sciences.

Biography 
Ibrohim Abdurakhmanov was born on 19 February 1975 in the village of Govasoy, Chust district, Namangan region. In 1997 he graduated from Tashkent State University (now the National University of Uzbekistan), receiving a bachelor's degree in biotechnology. Scholarship holder of the ″Umid″ Foundation. In 2001, he graduated from the Texas A&M University (US) with a Master of Science degree in plant breeding, after which he returned to Uzbekistan to continue his scientific activities.

In 2002, Ibrohim Abdurakhmanov defended his PhD thesis in the field of molecular genetics and took the position of senior researcher at the Institute of Genetics and Experimental Plant Biology of the Academy of Sciences of the Republic of Uzbekistan.

From 2002 to 2008, in collaboration with American scientists, he was engaged in research on cotton genomics. The result of these studies was the development of gene-knockout technology for obtaining high-quality, long-staple, high-yielding and early-ripening cotton varieties with a developed root system.

In 2008 he defended his doctoral thesis in the field of molecular genetics and received the degree of Doctor of Biological Sciences. In 2011 he was awarded the title of professor of molecular genetics and molecular biotechnology of the Academy of Sciences of Uzbekistan.

In 2012, Ibrohim Abdurakhmanov led the process of creating a new independent research center – the Center for Genomics and Bioinformatics at the Academy of Sciences of the Republic of Uzbekistan, the Ministry of Agriculture and Water Resources, the ″Uzpakhtasanoat″ Association, and was appointed its head. In 2016, this center was considered the largest scientific institution of the Academy of Sciences of Uzbekistan.

26 October 2014 in Muscat (Oman) became a member of the World Academy of Sciences. In 2017 he was appointed Acting Vice President of the Academy of Sciences of the Republic of Uzbekistan.

On 29 November 2017, President of Uzbekistan Shavkat Mirziyoyev appointed Ibrohim Abdurakhmanov to the post of Minister of Innovative Development of the Republic of Uzbekistan. Under the leadership of Abdurakhmanov, the "Strategy for Innovative Development of the Republic of Uzbekistan for 2019 – 2021" and "Strategy for Innovative Development of the Republic of Uzbekistan for 2022–2026" were developed and subsequently approved by the Decree of the President of the Republic of Uzbekistan. By the Decree of the President of 7 July 2022, Ibrahim Abdurakhmanov was appointed Chairman of the Cotton Council.

At the end of 2022, the structure of the government was reorganized in Uzbekistan. By the Presidential decree, Ibrokhim Abdurakhmonov was appointed to the position of Minister of Higher Education, Science and Innovation of the Republic of Uzbekistan.

Scientific activity 
Ibrokhim Abdurakhmanov specializes in research on plant genomics, germplasm characteristics, genetic mapping, marker breeding, transgenomics, proteomics and bioinformatics.

Under the direct supervision of Abdurakhmonov, for the first time in the world, using the "non-equilibrium linkage" method, markers were identified that are used to breed elite varieties of cotton. There were also Molecular genetic passports of cotton varieties grown in Uzbekistan created.

Ibrokhim Abdurakhmonov, in collaboration with colleagues from the University of Texas and the US Department of Agriculture, developed technologies for "turning off" cotton genes (RNA interference), as well as the practical application of this technology. With the help of this gene-knockout technology, high-quality, long-staple, high-yielding and early-ripening cotton varieties with a developed root system were obtained.

Managed such projects as: "Molecular mapping of fiber yield and quality genes by using the germplasm resources of the cotton plant of Uzbekistan", "Characterization and molecular mapping of phytochromes and flowering genes in cotton", "Molecular characterization and association of quantitative trait genes/loci for Fusarium wilt disease" and"Evaluation of potential resistance of cotton germplasm against gall nematode, Fusarium wilt disease and development of candidate gene markers".

Professor Abdurakhmanov is a member of the Executive Committee of the Higher Attestation Commission under the Cabinet of Ministers of the Republic of Uzbekistan, which coordinates and certifies the award of scientific titles in the field of biology, agricultural sciences and veterinary medicine. Professor Abdurakhmanov is a member of the Executive Committee of the Higher Attestation Commission under the Cabinet of Ministers of the Republic of Uzbekistan, which coordinates and certifies the award of scientific titles in the field of biology, agricultural sciences and veterinary medicine.

Today he is a member of the editorial board of several international and national journals on plant science, such as the American Journal of Plant Sciences, Plant Genomics, Integrated OMICS, "Technologies of the 21st Century", etc. Conducts a special course on molecular genetics, genetic engineering, biotechnology and human genetics for students of the Tashkent State Agrarian University, the National University of Uzbekistan and the Tashkent Pharmaceutical Institute. Supervised the work of undergraduates in higher educational institutions and advised a number of candidate and doctoral dissertations.

Awards 

 1998 – ″Umid″ Foundation Scholarship to study at Texas A&M University.
 2004 and 2006 – first-degree diploma of the ″ISTEDOD″ Foundation for active participation in conferences held for specialists studying abroad. 
 2010 – TWAS International Academy of Sciences Award for fundamental research in the field of agriculture and contribution to the genetic diversity of the cotton genome.
 2010 – Government award "Kukrak Nishoni".
 2013 – ″2013 ICAC Cotton Researcher of the Year″ by the International Cotton Advisory Committee (ICAC) for contributions to cotton genomics and biotechnology.
 2016 – Breastplate "25 years of independence of Uzbekistan" for contribution to the development of science and technology in the country.
 2018 – SCOPUS AWARD-2018 "The Best Scientist in Agriculture", jointly awarded by the scientific publishing house Elsevier and the Ministry of Higher Education of the Republic of Uzbekistan.
 2021 – Government award "Honored Inventor and Innovator" for outstanding contribution to reforms in the field of science, technology and innovation in the Republic of Uzbekistan.
 2021 – Breastplate "30 years of Independence of Uzbekistan" for contribution to the development of science and technology in the country.
 2022 – ″Silk Road Friendship Ambassador Award″ from the Alliance of International Science Organizations (ANSO), the China International Culture Exchange Center (CICEC) and the International People's Magazine (GPM) for contribution to the development of bilateral cooperation between foreign countries.
 2023 – Winner of the UNESCO International Prize for Research in the Life Sciences.

References 

Afghan Uzbek politicians
1975 births
Living people
People from Namangan Region
Members of the Academy of Sciences of Uzbekistan
National University of Uzbekistan alumni
Texas A&M University alumni
Molecular geneticists
Uzbekistani scientists